Vali kord is a 2004 Estonian documentary film directed by Andres Maimik.

Awards:
 2004: Riga International Film Festival, program: Forum 2004 - Magical Crystal
 2005: Ismailia International Film Festival for Documentary and Short Films (Egypt), best documentary film, and FIPRESCI prize
 2005: Estonian Film Journalists' Association's award: Neitsi Maali award (best film of the year)

Plot

Cast
 Rain Tolk - Tolk
 Ken Saan - Ken

References

External links
 Vali kord, entry in Estonian Film Database (EFIS)

2004 films
Estonian documentary films
Estonian-language films